Appleby Friary was a friary in Cumbria, England.

Monasteries in Cumbria